Kindred is a city in Cass County, North Dakota, United States. The population was 889 at the time of the 2020 census. Kindred primarily serves as a bedroom community for Fargo, located about 25 miles to the southwest.

History
Kindred was platted in 1880 when the railroad was extended to that point. The city was named for William A. Kindred, a local businessman and afterward mayor of Fargo, North Dakota. A post office has been in operation at Kindred since 1881. Kindred was incorporated as a city in 1949.

Geography
Kindred is located at  (46.647973, -97.016486).

Demographics

2010 census
As of the census of 2010, there were 692 people, 267 households, and 185 families living in the city. The racial makeup of the city was 96.0% White, 0.1% African American, 0.7% Native American, 1.2% from other races, and 2.0% from two or more races. Hispanic or Latino of any race were 1.4% of the population.

There were 267 households, of which 44.6% had children under the age of 18 living with them, 56.2% were married couples living together, 8.6% had a female householder with no husband present, 4.5% had a male householder with no wife present, and 30.7% were non-families. 24.0% of all households were made up of individuals, and 6% had someone living alone who was 65 years of age or older. The average household size was 2.59 and the average family size was 3.16.

The median age in the city was 32.5 years. 33.1% of residents were under the age of 18; 5.4% were between the ages of 18 and 24; 30.9% were from 25 to 44; 20.8% were from 45 to 64; and 9.7% were 65 years of age or older. The gender makeup of the city was 50.3% male and 49.7% female.

2000 census
As of the census of 2000, there were 614 people, 248 households, and 167 families living in the city. The population density was 615.3 people per square mile (237.1/km2). There were 267 housing units at an average density of 267.6 per square mile (103.1/km2). The racial makeup of the city was 98.37% White, 0.16% African American, 0.33% Native American, 0.16% Asian, and 0.98% from two or more races. Hispanic or Latino of any race were 0.98% of the population.

There were 248 households, out of which 38.3% had children under the age of 18 living with them, 56.9% were married couples living together, 6.5% had a female householder with no husband present, and 32.3% were non-families. 28.2% of all households were made up of individuals, and 12.5% had someone living alone who was 65 years of age or older. The average household size was 2.48 and the average family size was 3.06.

In the city, the population was spread out, with 30.8% under the age of 18, 5.2% from 18 to 24, 35.0% from 25 to 44, 15.5% from 45 to 64, and 13.5% who were 65 years of age or older. The median age was 34 years. For every 100 females, there were 93.1 males. For every 100 females age 18 and over, there were 93.2 males.

The median income for a household in the city was $43,250, and the median income for a family was $49,091. Males had a median income of $31,607 versus $22,167 for females. The per capita income for the city was $18,314. About 4.6% of families and 6.2% of the population were below the poverty line, including 7.7% of those under age 18 and 8.8% of those age 65 or over.

Education
The Kindred Public School District was organized in 1875. It is one of the largest rural schools in Cass County. As of the 2007–2008 school year, Kindred Public School has an enrollment of 360 students in grades K-6, 120 students in grades 7–8, and 187 students in grades 9-12. This comes to an overall total of 667 students for the 2007–2008 school year.

Notable people
 Kevin Cramer, member of the United States Senate since 2019
 Anna Palmer, journalist

References

External links
 Kindred Public School
Kindred centennial, 1880-1980 : Kindred, North Dakota, July 4, 5, 6 from the Digital Horizons website
Kindred, North Dakota : community fact survey (1967) from the Digital Horizons website

Cities in Cass County, North Dakota
Cities in North Dakota
Populated places established in 1880
1880 establishments in Dakota Territory